Lucina (minor planet designation: 146 Lucina) is a main-belt asteroid that was discovered by Alphonse Borrelly on June 8, 1875, and named after Lucina, the Roman goddess of childbirth. It is large, dark and has a carbonaceous composition. The spectra of the asteroid displays evidence of aqueous alteration.

Photometric observations of this asteroid made during 1979 and 1981 gave a light curve with a period of 18.54 hours.

Two stellar occultations by Lucina have been observed so far, in 1982 and 1989. During the first event, a possible small satellite with an estimated 5.7 km diameter was detected at a distance of 1,600 km from 146 Lucina. A 1992 search using a CCD failed to discover a satellite larger than 0.6 km, although it may have been obscured by occultation mask. Further evidence for a satellite emerged in 2003, this time based on astrometric measurements.

References

External links 
 
 

000146
Discoveries by Alphonse Borrelly
Named minor planets
000146
000146
000146
18750608